Paectes nana is a moth in the family Euteliidae. It is widespread from Florida through the Greater Antilles (except for Puerto Rico) and from Mexico to Costa Rica. In South America, it is found in Venezuela, Colombia and northern Ecuador. It has been introduced to the Galapagos Islands.

The forewing length is 10.9–11.6 mm for males and 9.4–9.9 mm for females. Adults are sexually dimorphic. There are two distinct forms. The most easily recognized bears exaggerated dark markings on the apical portion of the postmedial line that is contiguous with the subapical dash. The other form most resembles both Paectes asper, but in Paectes nana, the forewing costa is gray with small, faint, dark-gray quadrate spots along the margin. Adults are probably on wing year round with recorded dates from January to March, June to July, September to October and December.

The larvae have been reared from Schinus terebinthifolius. Other records include Bursera simaruba and Bursera tomentosa.

The moth was originally named Paectes isabel after the artist Isabel Cooper (artist).

References

Moths described in 1865
Euteliinae